Varicospira cancellata, common name the cancellated beak shell, is a species of sea snail, a marine gastropod mollusk in the family Rostellariidae, the true conchs.

Description
the length of the shell attains 36 mm.

(Described as  Rimella cancellata) The whorls are cancellated, occasionally varicose. The siphonal canal is produced upon the spire, which it ascends in a curved line. The interior of the outer lip is dentate. The color of the shell is pale yellowish brown, indistinctly banded with pale chestnut.

Distribution
This marine species occurs in the Indo-West Pacific; also off India, in the Andaman Sea,  Thailand and Myanmar, the Philippines, Indonesia; off Taiwan, the China Seas, Solomon Islands, off Papua New Guinea and Australia (Queensland, Western Australia)

References

 Linnaeus, C. 1767. Systema naturae, per regna tria naturae, secundum classes, ordines, genera, species, cum caracteribus, differentiis, synonymis, locis. Holmiae
 Lamarck J.B. (1816). Liste des objets représentés dans les planches de cette livraison. In: Tableau encyclopédique et méthodique des trois règnes de la Nature. Mollusques et Polypes divers. Agasse, Paris. 16 pp.
 Cotton, B.C. 1953. No. 3. Strombidae. Royal Society of South Australia Malacological Section 4pp. (as Rimella cancellata Lamarck, 1799); Wilson, B. 1993. Australian Marine Shells. Prosobranch Gastropods. Kallaroo, Western Australia : Odyssey Publishing Vol. 1 408 pp. [160] (as Rimella cancellata Lamarck, 1816).
 Kreipl, K. & Poppe, G.T. 1999. A Conchological Iconography: The Family Strombidae. Hackenheim, Germany : ConchBooks 59 pp., 130 pls.
 Iredale, T., 1958. To memorize Lee. The Marine Zoologist 1(6):84-85) [in] Proceedings of the Royal Zoological Society of New South Wales for 1956-1957
 Subba Rao, N.V. 1977. On collection of Strombidae (Mollusca: Gastropoda) from Bay of Bengal, Arabian Sea and western Indian Ocean - 2. Genera Lambis, Terebellum, Tibia and Rimella. Journal of the Marine Biological Association of India 19(1): 21-34 
 Wilson, B. 1993. Australian Marine Shells. Prosobranch Gastropods. Kallaroo, Western Australia : Odyssey Publishing Vol. 1 408 pp. 
 Raven, H 2002. Notes on molluscs from NW Borneo. 1. Stromboidea (Gastropoda, Strombidae, Rostellariidae, Seraphidae). Vita Malacologica 1: 3-32
 Liverani V. (2014) The superfamily Stromboidea. Addenda and corrigenda. In: G.T. Poppe, K. Groh & C. Renker (eds), A conchological iconography. pp. 1-54, pls 131-164. Harxheim: Conchbooks.

External links

Gastropods described in 1816